John IV (died September 2, 595), also known as John Nesteutes (Ioannes the Faster), was the 33rd bishop or Patriarch of Constantinople (April 11, 582 – 595). He was the first to assume the title Ecumenical Patriarch. He is regarded as a saint by the Eastern Orthodox Church which holds a feast on September 2.

Life
Joannes (surnamed Jejunator, sometimes also Cappadox) was born at Constantinople of artisan parents, and worked as a goldsmith. Under the Patriarch John III (565–577) he was deacon at the Hagia Sophia church; then he became sakellarios (an official who acts as patriarchal vicar for monasteries). He was famous for his ascetical life and called "the Faster". Under Eutychius I (552–565 and 577–582) he became an important person among the clergy of the city. At Eutychius's death he was made patriarch by the Emperor Tiberius II (578–582).

According to one account, a horse show was scheduled in the Hippodrome on eve of the Feast of Pentecost. Patriarch John found his flock's attendance unacceptable. Through the patriarch's fervent prayer a terrible thunderstorm arose with rain and hailstones so that everyone dispersed in fear and came to realize the inappropriateness of such entertainment.

Under the next emperor, Maurice (582–602), he was still a favourite at court. He had always a great reputation for asceticism and charity to the poor. In 587 or 588, he summoned the bishops of the East in the name of "the Ecumenical Patriarch" to examine certain charges against Gregory, Patriarch of Antioch, (although Fortescue questions on what authority). John was Patriarch of Constantinople from 582 – 595, and was the first to use the title "Ecumenical Patriarch."

Patriarch Gregory was acquitted and returned to his episcopal see. A report was sent to Rome and Pope Pelagius II solemnly annulled the acts of this council. In 590 Pope Pelagius II was succeeded by Gregory I, who was initially on good terms with John IV, whom he had known when Gregory served as legate at Constantinople.

In 593, John was severely blamed by Pope Gregory I for having allowed an Isaurian presbyter named Anastasius, who had been accused of heresy, to be beaten with ropes in the church of Constantinople.

In 595, the controversy was again rife about the title of Ecumenical Patriarch. Gregory wrote to his legate Sabinianus forbidding him to communicate with John. In the case of a presbyter named Athanasius, accused of being to some extent a Manichean, and condemned as such, Gregory tried to show that the accuser was himself a Pelagian, and that by the carelessness, ignorance, or fault of John IV, the Nestorian council of Ephesus had actually been mistaken for the Orthodox Council of Ephesus.

Works
Isidore of Seville (de Script. Eccl. 26) attributes to him only a letter, not now extant, on baptism addressed to St. Leander. John, he says, "propounds nothing of his own, but only repeats the opinions of the ancient Fathers on trine immersion."

There are, however, several works attributed to John IV still extant (edited in Patrologia Graeca vol. 88):

His Penitential, Libellus Poenitentialis, or, as it is described in Book III of the work of Leo Allatius, de Consensu Utriusque Ecclesiae (Rome, 1655, quarto), Praxis Graecis Praescripta in Confessione Peragenda.
Instructio, qua non modo confitens de confessione pie et integre edenda instituitur, sed etiam sacerdos, qua ratione confessiones excipiat, poenitentiam imponat et reconciliationem praestet informatur.
Homily on penitence, continence, and virginity. It is often printed among Chrysostom's homilies, but now agreed not to be Chrysostom's. Montfaucon, Vossius, and Pearson held it to be by John the Faster; Morel and Savile printed it among Chrysostom's works.
Homily on False Prophets and False Doctrine. It is attributed occasionally to Chrysostom, by Peter Wastel to John of Jerusalem, but by Vossius, Petavius, and Cave to John the Faster.
A set of Precepts to a Monk, in a manuscript at the Paris library.

The Orthodox in the Middle Ages always attributed the first two of these to the Patriarch.

The Canons of the Faster
An important section of the Eastern Orthodox canon law is attributed to John IV, i.e. the so-called Canons of John the Faster and the Kanonikon attached to them. They can be found in both Greek and Slavonic versions of the canon law, notably in Theodor Balsamon's collection and in the Pedalion of Nicodemus the Hagiorite. The German byzantinist Georg Beck analysed the canons and concluded that they were probably written partly by followers of Basil the Great and partly by John Chrysostom whereas the Kanonikon dates from the 10th century. These writings are interesting as they reflect in detail on the sexual morals as they generally were held prior to Thomas Aquinas, e.g. that sodomy (arsenokoitia) was not thought of primarily in same-sex terms but in terms of anal intercourse. Sodomy between husband and wife was penanced more severely than sodomy between unmarried males (eight years of exclusion from communion rather than just four). Mutual masturbation, regardless whether it was between members of the same sex or not, was penanced with 80 days exclusion from communion. It shows that a) not only extra-marital sex is considered sinful but also certain sexual practies within marriage and b) that the same-sex aspect in sodomy is mitigating rather than aggravating relatively to a marital sodomy. This is because committing sodomy inside marrigage was considered not only as a depravation of sex, but also of marriage; while a sodomy outside marriage only had the former problem and not the latter.

References

Attribution
  cites:
Jacques Paul Migne reproduces the Penitential, the Instructions for Confession, and the Homily on Penitence in Patrologia Graeca lxxxviii. 1089.
Baronius, ad. ann. 588–593
Acta Sanctorum (Bollandist) August  1, p. 69
Fleury, ii. bk. xxxiv. c. 44, etc.
Ceillier, xi. 427, etc.
Fabricius, Bibl. Graec. xi. 108, xii. 239.
 Dokos, G., Exomologetarion – A Manual of Confessions by our Righteous God-bearing Father Nikodemos the Hagiorite, 2006, Thessalonica, Uncut Mountain Press
 Agapius & Nicodemus, The Rudder (Pedalion) – All the Sacred and Divine Canons, 1957, The Orthodox Christian Educational Society, Chicago

External links
 Orthodox icon and synaxarion

595 deaths
6th-century patriarchs of Constantinople
6th-century Christian saints
Year of birth unknown